Gabriel Snitka (born 14 August 1985) is a Slovak football defender who currently plays for Dukla Banská Bystrica.

External links
Futbalnet profile
ZP Futbal profile

References

1985 births
Living people
Slovak footballers
Association football defenders
FK Železiarne Podbrezová players
FK Dukla Banská Bystrica players
Slovak Super Liga players
2. Liga (Slovakia) players
Sportspeople from Banská Bystrica